The Cupaș is a left tributary of the river Bicaz in Romania. The lower reach of the river defines the border between Harghita and Neamț counties. It discharges into the Bicaz in the Bicaz Gorge, near the village Lacu Roșu.

References

Rivers of Romania
Rivers of Neamț County
Rivers of Harghita County